Henrik Shipstead (January 8, 1881June 26, 1960) was an American politician. He served in the United States Senate from 1923 to 1947, from the state of Minnesota. He served first as a member of the Minnesota Farmer-Labor Party from 1923 to 1941 and then as a Republican from 1941 to 1947.

Few members of Congress in American history were more consistent in opposing US foreign interventionism.

Shipstead was born on a farm in Kandiyohi County, Minnesota, in 1881 to Norwegian immigrant parents. In the early 20th century, he set up a dental practice and was elected president of the village council of Glenwood in neighboring Pope County.

Political career
Shipstead started as a Republican but in 1922 was elected to the US Senate under the banner of the new Farmer-Labor Party. While he generally shared the party's left-wing agenda, he rejected the extreme anti-capitalism of some members. Although he was the only Farmer-Laborite in the Senate, he won appointment to the powerful Foreign Relations Committee.

Shipstead opposed U.S. entry into the League of Nations and the World Court. He called for the cancellation of German reparations, which he regarded as vindictive. Unlike non-interventionists in the Old Right, he objected to the U.S. occupation of Haiti, the Dominican Republic and Nicaragua. He blamed these interventions on the Roosevelt Corollary to the Monroe Doctrine of 1905, which had turned the United States into an arrogant "policeman of the western continent."

Isolationism
Shipstead did not consider himself an isolationist. While he favored a policy of political non-intervention overseas, he opposed the Smoot-Hawley Tariff of 1930, which he called "one of the greatest and most vicious isolationist policies this government has ever enacted." He argued that high tariffs "raise prices to consumers" and make "monopolies richer and people poorer." Affable and dignified, his adversaries generally liked him personally. He concluded, "It doesn't necessarily follow that a radical has to be a damned fool."

Along with Congressman Robert Luce of Massachusetts, he introduced the bill that enlarged the purview of the United States Commission of Fine Arts to include new buildings on private land facing federal property. The commission, established in 1910, reviews new buildings, memorials, monuments, and public art constructed on federal property in Washington, D.C. The bill, the Shipstead-Luce Act, is still in effect.

Shipstead defected from the Farmer-Labor party in the late 1930s, charging that Communist elements were taking control. He won reelection to the Senate in 1940 as a Republican.

Antisemitism
Shipstead was "a known antisemite." He was an outspoken ally of Henry Ford and Charles Lindbergh, and he trafficked in anti-Jewish conspiracy theories, as well as straightforward bigotry against Jewish people. Shipstead said he believed that The Protocols of the Elders of Zion were fact, and he frequently encouraged other people to read them.
Meanwhile, few fought more tenaciously against Franklin D. Roosevelt's efforts to enter the war in Europe. Although Shipstead voted for the declaration of war after the attack on Pearl Harbor, he still maintained his independence from Roosevelt. In October 1942, for example, he was one of the very few to vote against Selective Service, just as he had in 1940.

World War II
In April 1943 Isaiah Berlin, a top British expert on American politics, secretly prepared an analysis for the British Foreign Office that stated that Shipstead was:

In protest of his views, a group of southern senators including J. Lister Hill, John H. Bankhead II, Tom Stewart, Kenneth McKellar, Richard Russell Jr. and Walter F. George stopped conversing, got up, and left from the Senate's lunch counter when Senator Shipstead attempted to join them, with Hill later telling reporters they "would not associate" with the Senator due to his isolationist views. Later, after a private argument with the same six Senators, Shipstead lamented what he called the "extreme Anglophilia of the southern states." Richard Russell Jr. said that Shipstead was "a chicken" who was "in kahoots" with Germany.

Postwar
Shipstead's vote against US entry into the United Nations was entirely predictable by anyone who had followed his career. It was the capstone of decades of opposition to foreign entanglements. Like many modern conservative critics of the UN, he feared that it would foster a world superstate. But he also believed that the major powers would use the UN as a tool to dominate smaller countries. He and William Langer were the only two senators to vote against the United Nations Charter. Not surprisingly, Shipstead and Langer were also among the seven senators who opposed full United States entry into the United Nations. These votes may have cost him reelection a year later. 

A new breed of "internationalists", led by Governor Edward John Thye and former Governor Stassen, assumed leadership of the Minnesota state GOP. In 1946, Shipstead lost the Republican primary to Thye. He retired to rural western Minnesota, where he died in 1960.

See also
 List of United States senators who switched parties

References

Further reading
David T. Beito, "Henrik Shipstead Against the UN," History News Network, July 28, 2005.
 Barbara Stuhler, "The Political Enigma of Henrik Shipstead," Ten Men of Minnesota and American Foreign Policy 1898–1968. St. Paul: Minnesota Historical Society, 1973. pp. 76–98.

External links

 
Henrik Shipstead photos at the Minnesota Historical Society

1881 births
1960 deaths
20th-century American politicians
20th-century Lutherans
American Lutherans
American people of Norwegian descent
Farmer–Labor Party United States senators
Minnesota Farmer–Laborites
Minnesota Republicans
Non-interventionism
Northwestern University Dental School alumni
Old Right (United States)
People from Alexandria, Minnesota
People from Kandiyohi County, Minnesota
People from Willmar, Minnesota
Republican Party United States senators from Minnesota